The New Year Honours 1901 were appointments to various orders and honours of the United Kingdom and British India.

The list was published in The Times on 1 January 1901, and the various honours were gazetted in The London Gazette on 28 December 1900 and 8 January 1901.

The recipients of honours are displayed or referred to as they were styled before their new honour and arranged by honour and where appropriate by rank (Knight Grand Cross, Knight Commander etc.) then division (Military, Civil).

Privy Council
 Lewis Fry, Esq.
 Thomas Frederick Halsey, Esq., MP
 Edmund Barton, QC, on the occasion of the Federation of the Australian Colonies
 Sir Samuel Walker Griffith, GCMG, Lieutenant-governor and Chief Justice of Queensland, on the occasion of the Federation of the Australian Colonies

Baronet
 John Aird, Esq., MP
 Thomas Barlow, Esq., MD, Physician Extraordinary to the Queen
 Jonathan Edmund Backhouse, Esq.
 William Selby Church, Esq., MD, FRCS
 Colonel Robert Gunter, MP
 Wyndham Spencer Portal, Esq.

Knight Bachelor
 Hugh Adcock, CMG
 Edward Henry Busk, Esq., Chairman of Convocation in the University of London
 Alfred Cooper, Esq., Surbiton
 Robert Harvey, Esq., High Sheriff of Cornwall
 Edward Wollaston Knocker, Esq., CB, Registrar of the Cinque Ports
 Hiram Maxim, Esq.
 John Mark, Esq., former Mayor of Manchester
 Joseph Sykes Rymer, Esq., late Lord Mayor of York
 Henry Miller, Speaker of the Legislative Council, New Zealand
 Arthur Robert Wallace, Esq., CB, DL, Principal Chief Clerk Secretary′s Office, Dublin Castle
 Edward Matthew Hodgson, Esq., JP, Chairman of the Rathmines and Rathgar Urban District Council
 John Quick, of Victoria, on the occasion of the Federation of the Australian Colonies

The Most Honourable Order of the Bath

Knight Grand Cross of the Order of the Bath (GCB) 
 Civil Division
 Sir Alfred Milner, KCB, High Commissioner for South Africa
 Sir Francis Mowatt, KCB, Secretary to the Treasury
 Lord Justice Romer

Knights Commander of the Order of the Bath (KCB) 
 Civil Division
 Edward Chandos Leigh, CB, QC, Counsel to the Speaker, House of Commons
 Richard Mills, Esq., CB, late Comptroller and Auditor General
 Sir William Turner, D.C.L.

Companions of the Order of the Bath (CB) 
Civil division
 Francis Alexander Campbell, Esq., of the Foreign Office
 Frederick Victor Dickins, Esq., Registrar to the University of London
 Lawrence Charles Edward Downing Dowdall, Esq., of the Irish Office
 George Vandeleur Fiddes, Esq., Colonial Office
 Robert O′Brien Furlong, Esq., Solicitor to the Inland Revenue Department, Ireland
 Lieutenant-Colonel Michael Clare Garcia, Inspector-General of Military Prisons
 Henry Paul Harvey, Esq., of the War Office
 Charles Prestwood Lucas, Esq., Assistant Under-Secretary of State, Colonial Office
 Malcolm McNeill, Esq., Chairman of the Local Government Board for Scotland
 Lieutenant-Colonel George Tindall Plunkett, Royal Engineers, Director of the Science and Art Department, Dublin

Order of the Star of India

Knight Commander of the Order of the Star of India (KCSI) 
 Charles Montgomery Rivaz, Esq., CSI, Ordinary Member of the Council of the Governor General of India

Companion of the Order of the Star of India (CSI)
 Frederick Styles Philpin Lely, Esq., Indian Civil Service
 John Ontario Miller, Esq., Indian Civil Service
 George Robert Irwin, Esq., Indian Civil Service
 William Robert Bright, Esq., Indian Civil Service

Order of Saint Michael and Saint George

Knight Grand Cross of the Order of St Michael and St George (GCMG)
 Sir John Forrest, LL.D, KCMG, Premier and Colonial Treasurer of Western Australia, on the occasion of the Federation of the Australian Colonies

Knight Commander of the Order of St Michael and St George (KCMG) 
 Brigadier-General Frederick John Dealtry Lugard, CB, DSO, High Commissioner for the Northern Nigeria Protectorate
 Sir Henry Nevill Dering, Baronet, CB, Her Majesty's Envoy Extraordinary and Minister Plenipotentiary to the United States of Brazil
 The Honourable William Augustus Curzon Barrington, Her Majesty's Envoy  and Minister Plenipotentiary to the Argentine Republic
 John Gordon Kennedy, Esq., Her Majesty's Envoy Extraordinary and Minister Plenipotentiary at the Court of His Majesty the King of Romania
 Colonel Herbert Jekyll, Royal Engineers, CMG, Secretary to the Royal Commission for the Paris Universal International Exhibition of 1900
 The Honourable Sir James Robert Dickson, DCL, CMG, Chief Secretary of Queensland, on the occasion of the Federation of the Australian Colonies
 William McMillan, Esq., formerly Colonial Treasurer of New South Wales, Chairman of the Finance Committee of the Australian Federal Convention, on the occasion of the Federation of the Australian Colonies
 Josiah Henry Symon, Esq., QC, formerly Attorney-General of South Australia, Chairman of the Judiciary Committee of the Australian Federal Convention, on the occasion of the Federation of the Australian Colonies

Companion of the Order of St Michael and St George (CMG)
 Colonel Gerald Charles Kitson, lately Commandant of the Royal Military College, Kingston, Canada
 Lieutenant-Colonel D la Cherois Thomas Irwin, formerly Inspector of Artillery in Canada, Secretary of the Canadian Patriotic Fund
 Maximilian Frank Simon, Esq., MD, on retirement as Principal Civil Medical Officer of the Straits Settlements
 William Shelford, Esq., MICE, Consulting Engineer for West African Railways
 William Matthews, Esq., MICE, Consulting Engineer for Harbour Work in the Colonies
 Francis Alfred Cooper, Esq., Director of Public Works of the Island of Ceylon
 Ralph Champneys Williams, Esq., Colonial Secretary of the Island of Barbados
 Alfredo Naudi, Esq., LL.D, Crown Advocate of the Island of Malta
 Thomas Robertson Marsh, Esq., on retirement as Head of the Engineering and Contract Branches of the Office for the Crown Agents for the Colonies 
 Charles Clive Bigham, Esq., Honorary Attaché to Her Majesty's Legation at Peking, attached to Admiral Seymour's force
 Charles William Campbell, Esq., Her Majesty's Vice-Consul at Shanghai, attached to Admiral Seymour's force
 Pelham Laird Warren, Esq., Her Majesty's Consul-General at Hankow
 William Richard Carles, Esq., Her Majesty's Consul at Tientsin
 Everard Duncan Home Fraser, Esq., Her Majesty's Consul at Chinkiang
 Edmund Robert Spearman, Esq., Assistant Secretary to the Royal Commission for the Paris Universal International Exhibition of 1900
 Lionel Earle, Esq., Assistant Secretary to the Royal Commission for the Paris Universal International Exhibition of 1900
 Herbert Hughes, Esq., for services in connection with International Industrial Conferences
 Edwin Gordon Blackmore, Esq., Clerk of the Legislative Council and Clerk of the Parliaments of South Australia, Clerk of the Australian Federal Convention, on the occasion of the Federation of the Australian Colonies
 Robert Randolph Garran, Esq., MA, Barrister, New South Wales, Secretary to the Drafting Committee of the Australian Federal Convention, on the occasion of the Federation of the Australian Colonies

Order of the Indian Empire

Knights Grand Commander of the Order of the Indian Empire (GCIE)
 Major General Sir Edwin Henry Hayter Collen, KCIE, CB, Military Member of the Council of the Governor General of India
 Maharao Raja Sir Raghubir Singh Bahadur, of Bundi

Knights Commander of the Order of the Indian Empire (KCIE) 
 Alexander Frederick Douglas Cunningham, Esq., CIE, Indian Civil Service
 Henry Evan Murchison James, Esq., CIE, Indian Civil Service

Honorary Knight Commander of the Order of the Indian Empire
 Colonel Eduardo Augusto Rodrigues Galhardo, Governor-General of Portuguese India

Companion of the Order of the Indian Empire (CIE)
 Mian Bhure Singh, of Chamba
 Captain Walter Somerville Goodridge, Royal Navy, Director of the Royal Indian Marine
 Lieutenant-Colonel Solomon Charles Frederick Peile, Indian Staff Corps
 Bertram Prior Standen, Esq., Indian Civil Service
 Henry Alexander Sim, Esq., Indian Civil Service
 Major James Robert Dunlop Smith, Indian Staff Corps
 Major John Crimmin, VC, Indian Medical Service
 Major Granville Henry Loch, Indian Staff Corps
 Fardunji Kuvarji Tarapurvala, Public Works Department, Executive Engineer, Ahmedabad
 Babu Kalinath Mitter, laletly Member of the Council of the Lieutenant-Governor of Bengal for making Laws and Regulations
 Frederick William Latimer Esq., Assistant Private Secretary to His Excellency the Viceroy of India
 William Jameson Soulsby, Esq., CB, Secretary to the Mansion House Indian Famine Relief Funds in 1877, 1897, and 1900

Kaisar-i-Hind Medal

References

New Year Honours
1901 in the United Kingdom
1901 awards